The Far Eastern curlew (Numenius madagascariensis) is a large shorebird most similar in appearance to the long-billed curlew, but slightly larger. It is mostly brown in color, differentiated from other curlews by its plain, unpatterned brown underwing. The body is reportedly , which may be equaled by the Eurasian curlew.

Distribution and habitat 

The Far Eastern curlew spends its breeding season in northeastern Asia, including Siberia to  Kamchatka, and Mongolia. Its breeding habitat is composed of marshy and swampy wetlands and lakeshores. Most individuals winter in coastal Australia, with a few heading to South Korea, Thailand, Philippines and New Zealand, where they stay at estuaries, beaches, and salt marshes. During its migration the Far Eastern curlew commonly passes the Yellow Sea.

It uses its long, decurved bill to probe for invertebrates in the mud. It may feed in solitary but it generally congregates in large flocks to migrate or roost. Its call is a sharp, clear whistle, cuuue-reee, often repeated.

As of 2006, there are an estimated 38,000 individuals in the world. Formerly classified as least concern by IUCN, it was found to have been rarer than previously believed and thus its status was updated to "vulnerable" in the 2010 IUCN red list of threatened species.

In Australia its status under the Environment Protection and Biodiversity Conservation Act is "critically endangered".

Taxonomy
In 1760 the French zoologist Mathurin Jacques Brisson included a description of the Far Eastern curlew in his Ornithologie based on a specimen. He used the French name  and the Latin Numenius madagascariensis. Although Brisson coined Latin names, these do not conform to the binomial system and are not recognised by the International Commission on Zoological Nomenclature. When in 1766 the Swedish naturalist Carl Linnaeus updated his Systema Naturae for the twelfth edition, he added 240 species that had been previously described by Brisson. One of these was the far eastern curlew, for which he coined the binomial name Scolopax madagascariensis.

References

Further reading
 O'Brien, Michael et al. (2006). The Shorebird Guide. New York: Houghton Mifflin. 
 A Yellow Sea species account

Far Eastern curlew
Birds of North Asia
Far Eastern curlew
Far Eastern curlew
Articles containing video clips